Because I Got High is the second studio album by Mississippi-based rapper Afroman. The record was released on T-Bones Records in the year 2000. Although a Canada-exclusive release, it was otherwise sold and distributed via live performances. The title track of the record stands as Afroman's most popular and best-selling song.

Because I Got High went to Number One on the New Zealand charts, where it stayed for four weeks, in 2000. The songs "Because I Got High", "Mississippi", "Hush", "Tumbleweed", "She Won't Let Me Fuck", "Tall Cans" and "American Dream" would all later be used on The Good Times in 2001.

Track listing

References 

2000 albums
Afroman albums
Cannabis music
T-Bones Records albums